Barry D. Orms (born May 1, 1946) is a retired American professional basketball player. He was born in St. Louis, Missouri. He played college basketball for Saint Louis.

A 6'3" (1.90 m) guard from Saint Louis University, Orms was selected by the Baltimore Bullets in the eighth round of the 1968 NBA draft. He played one season with the Bullets, averaging 2.8 points per game. Orms then jumped to the American Basketball Association, where he increased his scoring average to 9.1 points per game in one season with the Indiana Pacers and Pittsburgh Pipers. As a playwright, Mr. Orms wrote "Bones", a play that emphasis basketball and religion.

References

1946 births
Living people
American men's basketball players
Baltimore Bullets (1963–1973) draft picks
Baltimore Bullets (1963–1973) players
Basketball players from St. Louis
Indiana Pacers players
Pittsburgh Pipers players
Saint Louis Billikens men's basketball players
Shooting guards